Al-Jabira, also sometimes spelled al-Jabri, was the name of a  family based in Aleppo.

The Jabri Family (الجابري) was one of the most prominent, patriotic and wealthy families in Syria during the 18th century and well into the 20th century.  Patrilineally, the family is descended from Ahmad bin Mousa Bin Abu baker Al Jabira Housaini.  However, the family name Jabiri is derived matrilinearly through Fatima, daughter of an Ottoman judge named Jabir Bin Ahmad Al-Halabi of Aleppo who had considerable wealth and power at the time of her birth. One of their descendants was Zaid Jabiri.

The Jabri Family was also famous in Yemen and India Hyderabad - During the time of  His Exalted Highness Nawab Sir Mir Osman Ali Khan Siddiqi, Asaf Jah VII - Hyderabad india many arabs arrived from Arab for worked in Hyderabad and appointed as Army Personnel

Salam bin Saied Al Jabri also one of the employee of Mir Osman Ali khan during that time.

Family rise to power 1700s 

After the early death of his father Mousa, Ahmad was raised by his grandfather Qadi (the judge) Jabir, as an orphan the young boy kept by his grandfather's side, people started to refer to him as jabir son (Ibn Jabir) which was passed along to some of his sons and grandsons who were later referred to as Jabiris (the sons of Jabir).

Members of this family had become important Ulema by the second half of the 18th century. In 1760 the head of the family was Ahmad Jabiri, who lived in the quarter of 'Aynayn in the western suburbs of the city and owned considerable property over there which he inherited from his mother mostly.

In 1765 about five years before his death, Ahmad created a waqf from this property, including the family home, which was to be a residence for his descendants, Nevertheless, before he died three of his four sons had moved into new houses in different quarters of the city:

Taha: a clerk in court and moved to Farafira,

As'ad: stayed in 'Aynayn,

Yousif: started as teacher in Aleskandaria school in bab al jynayn, then he moved to Masabin although he spent most of his time in Istanbul where he had taken a post as clerk in the imperial divan.

Mustafa: Moved to Suwayqat 'Ali, he worked in court as Head of Kateb (chief clerk), later he became Mufti Halab and Naqeeb Al Alshraf two positions only given to direct descendants of profit Mohamed at that time, and considered the highest religious authority in the city.

All Jabiri's today are descendants from Mustafa, he was the first to make the name jabiri official in court.

Mustafa had two sons, Abdullah and Abdul Qader, Abdullah succeeded his father as Mufti and Naqeeb Alashraf, Abdul Qader was mutasalem and handled the family expanding business, these Jabiri brothers Abdullah and Abdul Qader were among the most powerful men in Aleppo in the first decades of the 19th century and were heavily involved in the factional politics of that time.

Their political success were closely linked to their joint efforts.
Between them, they shared some of the most important local religious offices: Mufti, Ra'is al-kuttab, na'ib (deputy judge) of the court, and naqib al-ashraf.

When Abdullah became a Judge, serving for a time in Izmir, his brother Abdul Qader succeeded him as naqib al-ashraf.
After Abdullah's death, his son Ahmad II became Mufti Halab.

In the next 100 years the family members continued their quest for success Using their fathers heritage and building over it, unlike other families at the time, they kept the family bonds very close, although a shorted in numbers they were able to produce many mufti's, Ulama, poets, and most importantly politicians, like:

Ali Ghaleb bin Sa'eed Al Jabri: he was appointed In Istanbul as a representative of Aleppo in Majles shoura (Ottoman version of parliament)
Sedeeq Bin Abdulhameed Al Jabri, Sa'd eldeen Al jabri, both are poets and men of religious.

Mohamad As'ad Pasha bin Ali Al Jabri: He was Judge in several courts in Aleppo and politician.

Abdul Qader Lutfi Bin Murad Al Jabri: Known as "Haji Afandi", he started as a poor man, but then he worked in agriculture and got rich from it, had a considerable properties all over aleppo and a market in old part of the city that held his name till now (Souq Haji Afandi), later he became Mufti Halab, and a member of city council.

from Abdul Qader Lutfi the crown jewel of the Jabiri family was born, His excellency the National leader, who engineered the Syrian independence in 1954'' Sa'adAllah Al Jabiri (سعد الله الجابري)''' and his two brothers Ihsan (إحسان الجابري) and, Nafe' Pasha (نافع باشا الجابري)

As you walk in modern Aleppo you can still see many streets and public squares, schools and whole areas named after this family, which played a very important role in Aleppo's history for the past 300 years.

Other famous Members of the family
Majd Eldeen Al Jabiri, Aladin Al Jabiri.
Lamia' al-Jabiri, wife of Ba'thist Mustafa Tlas  

Salam bin Saied Al Jabri family chain Mahsan bin salam al jabri EX - Servicemen at UAE Police Airwing - Naser bin salam al jabri EX -Military Officer - Rasheed bin Mahsan Al jabri - Adil bin Mahsan Al Jabri - Security manager in Qatar are the family members of Jabri families India.

References

 The Kin Who Count: Family and society in Ottoman Aleppo, 1770-1840 by Margaret Lee Meriwether,
 The Ottoman City Between East and West: Aleppo Izmir and Istanbul, Political Factions In Aleppo 1760-1826 by Herbert Luther Bodman, The James Sprunt studies in history and political science.

Syrian families
Arabic-language surnames
Surnames
Al-Jabiri family
Political families of Syria